Émile Alphonse Louis Merlin (12 October 1875 in Mons – 29 July 1938 in Le Bourg d'Oisans) was a Belgian mathematician and astronomer.

Merlin attended the secondary school Athénée royal de Bruxelles. He then studied at the University of Liège and the University of Ghent, where in 1900 he received his doctorate in mathematics. This was followed by a stay abroad between 1901–1903 in Paris at the Sorbonne, at the Collège de France and in Göttingen. In 1904 he became an assistant at the observatory in Uccle. In 1909 he was promoted to astronomer adjoint. From 1912 he was a lecturer on astronomy and geodesy at the University of Ghent and in 1919 he became a full professor and director of the geographical station of the University of Ghent.

He was an alpinist and died in a mountain accident in the French Alps in Le Bourg d'Oisans.

Merlin was one of the editors for the French edition of Klein's encyclopedia.

For his work on celestial mechanics he was awarded the A. de Potter Prize of the Royal Belgian Academy of Sciences. He was president of the Belgian Mathematical Society, honorary member of the Astronomical Society of Mexico and member of the Commission for Mathematics and Astronomy of the National Fund for Research in Spain. He was Invited Speaker at the International Congress of Mathematicians in Toronto 1924 (Sur les lignes asymptotiques en géométrie infinitésimale) and Oslo 1936 (Sur certains mouvements des fluid parfaits).

Selected publications
with Paul Stroobant, Jules Delvosal, Hector Philippot, and Eugène Delporte:

References

External links
"Emile Merlin (1875–1938)" by Henri Louis Vanderlinden (obituary in Flemish with bibliography of Merlin's publications)

20th-century Belgian mathematicians
20th-century Belgian astronomers
1875 births
1938 deaths